Stop the Confusion (Global Interference) is a compilation album by drummer Keith LeBlanc, released on July 26, 2005, by Collision: Cause of Chapter 3.

Track listing

Release history

References 

2005 compilation albums
Keith LeBlanc albums
Albums produced by Keith LeBlanc